Jean-François Guité (March 30, 1852 – September 17, 1917) was a Canadian politician.

Born in Maria, Canada East, Guité was a lumber merchant by profession, and on his wife's side (Madeleine Caron from Perce, Que.) a descendant of Louis Hebert, who first arrived with Jacques Cartier at Port Royal, N.S., in 1606. He was appointed to the House of Commons of Canada after the death of the sitting MP, William LeBoutillier Fauvel by Guite's father's first cousin Sir Alphonse Pelletier, Speaker of Canada's Senate who later became Lieutenant Governor of Quebec. A Liberal, he did not run in 1900 election.

References
 

1852 births
1917 deaths
Liberal Party of Canada MPs
Members of the House of Commons of Canada from Quebec